The Crown Estate is a collection of lands and holdings in the United Kingdom belonging to the British monarch as a corporation sole, making it "the sovereign's public estate", which is neither government property nor part of the monarch's private estate.

The sovereign is not involved with the management or administration of the estate, and exercises only very limited control of its affairs. Instead, the estate's extensive portfolio is overseen by a semi-independent, incorporated public body headed by the Crown Estate Commissioners, who exercise "the powers of ownership" of the estate, although they are not "owners in their own right". The revenues from these hereditary possessions have been placed by the monarch at the disposition of His Majesty's Government in exchange for relief from the responsibility to fund the Civil Government. These revenues proceed directly to His Majesty's Treasury, for the benefit of the British nation. The Crown Estate is formally accountable to the Parliament of the United Kingdom, where it is legally mandated to make an annual report to the sovereign, a copy of which is forwarded to the House of Commons. In Scotland, the Crown Estate is managed by Crown Estate Scotland, a body formed in 2016.

The Crown Estate is one of the largest property managers in the United Kingdom, administering property worth £15.6 billion, with urban properties valued at £9.1 billion representing the majority of the estate by value. These include many properties in central London, but the estate also controls 7,920 km2 of agricultural land and forest and more than half of the UK's foreshore, and retains various other traditional holdings and rights, including Ascot Racecourse and Windsor Great Park. While Windsor Home Park is also part of the Crown Estate, occupied royal palaces, such as Windsor Castle itself, are not part of the Crown Estate, but are managed through the Royal Household. Naturally occurring gold and silver in the UK, collectively known as "Mines Royal", are managed by the Crown Estate and leased to mining operators.

Historically, Crown Estate properties were administered by the reigning monarch to help fund the business of governing the country. However, in 1760, George III surrendered control over the Estate's revenues to the Treasury, thus relieving him of the responsibility of paying for the costs of the civil service, defence costs, the national debt, and his own personal debts. In return, he received an annual grant known as the Civil List.

By tradition, each subsequent monarch agreed to this arrangement upon his or her accession. Since 1 April 2012, under the terms of the Sovereign Grant Act 2011 (SSG), the Civil List was abolished and the monarch has been provided with a stable source of revenue indexed to a percentage of the Crown Estate's annual net income (currently set at 25%). This was intended to provide a long-term solution and remove the politically sensitive issue of Parliament having to debate the Civil List allowance every ten years. Subsequently, the Sovereign Grant Act allows for all future monarchs to simply extend these provisions for their reigns by Order in Council. The act does not imply any legal change in the nature of the estate's ownership, but is simply a benchmark by which the sovereign grant is set as a grant by Parliament.

History

Crown land in England and Wales 
The history of the Crown lands in England and Wales begins with the Norman Conquest in 1066. When William I died, the land he had acquired by right of conquest was still largely intact. His successors granted large estates to the nobles and barons who supplied them with men and arms.  The monarch's remaining land was divided into royal manors, each managed separately by a seneschal. The period between the reigns of William I and Queen Anne was one of continuous alienation of lands.

The Crown lands were augmented as well as depleted over the centuries: Edward I extended his possessions into Wales, and James VI & I had his own Crown lands in Scotland which were ultimately combined with the Crown lands of England and Wales. The disposals outweighed the acquisitions: at the time of the Restoration in 1660, the total revenue arising from Crown lands was estimated to be £263,598 (equal to £ today). By the end of the reign of William III (1689–1702) it was reduced to some £6,000 (equal to £ today).

Before the reign of William III all the revenues of the kingdom were bestowed on the monarch for the general expenses of government. These revenues were of two kinds:
the hereditary revenues, derived principally from the Crown lands, feudal rights (commuted for the hereditary excise duties in 1660), profits of the post office, with licences, etc.
the temporary revenues derived from taxes granted to the king for a term of years or for life.

After the Glorious Revolution, Parliament retained under its own control the greater part of the temporary revenues, and relieved the sovereign of the cost of the naval and military services and the burden of the national debt. During the reigns of William III, Anne, George I and George II the sovereign remained responsible for the maintenance of the civil government and for the support of the royal household and dignity, being allowed for these purposes the hereditary revenues and certain taxes.

As the state machinery expanded, the cost of the civil government exceeded the income from the Crown lands and feudal rights; this created a personal debt for the monarch.

On George III's accession he surrendered the income from the Crown lands to Parliament, and abrogated responsibility for the cost of the civil government and the clearance of associated debts. As a result, and to avoid pecuniary embarrassment, he was granted a fixed civil list payment and the income retained from the Duchy of Lancaster. The King surrendered to parliamentary control the hereditary excise duties, post office revenues, and "the small branches" of hereditary revenue including rents of the Crown lands in England (which amounted to about £11,000, or £ today), and was granted a civil list annuity of £800,000 (equal to £ today) for the support of his household, subject to the payment of certain annuities to members of the royal family.

Although the King had retained large hereditary revenues, his income proved insufficient for his charged expenses because he used the privilege to reward supporters with bribes and gifts. Debts amounting to over £3 million (equal to £ today) over the course of George's reign were paid by Parliament, and the civil list annuity was then increased from time to time.

Every succeeding sovereign down to and including Charles III renewed the arrangement made between George III and Parliament. By the 19th century the practice was recognised as "an integral part of the Constitution [which] would be difficult to abandon". Nevertheless, a review of funding arrangements for the monarchy led to the passage of the Sovereign Grant Act 2011, which according to HM Treasury, is:

A new consolidated grant rounding together the Civil List, Royal Palaces and Royal Travel grants-in-aid. It is intended that future funding will be set as a fraction of The Crown Estate revenue and paid through the annual Treasury Estimates process, and subject to full National Audit Office audit....

The Grant is to enable The Queen to discharge her duties as Head of State. i.e. it meets the central staff costs and running expenses of Her Majesty's official Household – such things as official receptions, investitures, garden parties and so on. It will also cover the maintenance of the Royal Palaces in England and the cost of travel to carry out royal engagements such as opening buildings and other royal visits....

While the amount of the Grant will be linked to the profits of the Crown Estate, those profits will continue to be paid in to the Exchequer; they are not to be hypothecated. Setting the Grant at a percentage of profits of the Crown Estate will help to put in place a durable and transparent framework.

In April 2014 it was reported that the Crown Estate was proposing to sell about 200 of its 750 rural homes in the UK, and was evicting tenants in preparation.

Crown land in Ireland 
In 1793, George III surrendered the hereditary revenues of the Kingdom of Ireland, and was granted a civil list annuity for certain expenses of Irish civil government. Most of the Crown land by then was from forfeitures after the 1641 rebellion or the 1688–91 revolution, with some smaller older parcels remaining from earlier rebellions, the Dissolution of the Monasteries and the Norman period. Most confiscated land had been granted away again, as under the Adventurers' Act 1642, Act of Settlement 1662, and the Act of Resumption 1700.

The balance which remained in Crown hands included the "undisposed lands" of the 1662 settlement (worth less than the small quit rent that a grantee would have had to pay) and the balance unsold by the trustees under the 1700 act at its 1703 time limit. The scattered crown lands were farmed out on long leases with little regard to the collection of rent. Responsibility lay with the Quit Rent Office, which was absorbed in 1827 by the Commissioners of Woods, Forests and Land Revenues.

In 1828 the lease expired, and Richard Griffith was appointed to supervise its improvement, including the foundation of the model village of Kingwilliamstown. In the early 1830s the Crown Estate resumed possession of land in Ballykilcline following the insanity of the head lessee. The occupational sub-lessees were seven years in arrears with their rent and the result was the Ballykilcline "removals" – free emigration to the new world in 1846. There was further state-assisted emigration from overpopulated Crown estates during the Great Famine. There is evidence of Crown Estate public work schemes to employ the more distressed in improving drainage etc. In 1854 a select committee of the House of Lords concluded that the small estates in Ireland should be sold.  were subsequently sold for circa £25,000 (equal to £ today) at auction and £10,000 (equal to £ today) by private treaty: a major disinvestment, with reinvestment in Great Britain.

Article 11 of the 1922 Constitution of the Irish Free State provided that Crown Estate land within the Irish Free State would belong to the state, which took over administrative responsibilities on 1 April 1923. At the time of handover, quit rents totalled £23,418 (equal to £ today) and rent from property £1,191 (equal to £ today). The estates handed over mostly comprised foreshore.

The Crown Estate in Northern Ireland in 1960 comprised "a few quit rents ... yielding yearly only £38." By 2016 it had an income of £1.4m, from cables, pipelines and windfarms on the foreshore, and goldmining in County Tyrone. Development of the seabed below low tide is hampered by a sovereignty dispute with the Republic of Ireland.

Crown land in Scotland 
It was not until 1830 that King William IV revoked the income from the Crown estates in Scotland. The hereditary land revenues of the Crown in Scotland, formerly under the management of the Barons of the Exchequer, were transferred to the Commissioners of Woods, Forests, Land Revenues, Works and Buildings and their successors under the Crown Lands (Scotland) Acts of 1832, 1833 and 1835. These holdings mainly comprised former ecclesiastical land (following the abolition of the episcopacy in 1689) in Caithness and Orkney, and ancient royal possession in Stirling and Edinburgh, and feudal dues.

There was virtually no urban property. Most of the present Scottish estate excepting foreshore and salmon fishing is due to inward investment, including Glenlivet Estate, the largest area of land managed by the Crown Estate in Scotland, purchased in 1937, Applegirth, Fochabers and Whitehill estates, purchased in 1963, 1937 and 1969 respectively.

After winning the 2011 Scottish election, the Scottish National party (SNP) called for the devolution of the Crown Estate income to Scotland. In response to this demand, the Scotland Office decided against dividing up the Crown Estates. However, plans were developed to allocate some of the Crown Estate income to the Big Lottery Fund, which would then distribute funds to coastal communities. These plans were criticised by the SNP.

Crown Estate Scotland 
The Scotland Act of 2016 allowed the Scottish Government to take control of a portfolio of assets totalling £272 million ($339.6 million) after a devolved Scottish Crown Estate was established, including the rights to develop marine energy projects in the country. A new public body, Crown Estate Scotland (CES), was established to manage these assets.

Prior to the handover, the Crown Estate owned a multi-million stake in Fort Kinnaird retail park in Edinburgh representing about 60% of the value of all Crown assets in Scotland. This was not passed to Crown Estates Scotland with other Scottish properties in 2016. Two years later, the Crown Estate sold its stake and used the funds to assume full ownership of the Gallagher Retail Park in Cheltenham.

Present day

Crown Estate Act 1961 
The Crown Estate is now a statutory corporation run on commercial lines by the Crown Estate Commissioners under the provisions of the Crown Estate Act 1961. Under that Act, the Crown Estate Commissioners have a duty "while maintaining the Crown Estate as an estate in land [...] to maintain and enhance its value and the return obtained from it, but with due regard to the requirements of good management".

The Act provides among other things that (Section 1(5)) "The validity of transactions entered into by the Commissioners shall not be called in question on any suggestion of their not having acted in accordance with the provisions of this Act regulating the exercise of their powers, or of their having otherwise acted in excess of their authority, nor shall any person dealing with the Commissioners be concerned to inquire as to the extent of their authority or the observance of any restrictions on the exercise of their powers".

Summary of the Act 
The Act includes the following:
The Crown Estate is an estate in land only, apart from cash and gilts holdings necessary for the conduct of business.
The Crown Estate Commissioners, who comprise the main board, are approved by the monarch on the advice of the Prime Minister. They are limited to eight persons.
The board of commissioners have a duty to:
maintain and enhance the capital value of the estate and its revenue income; but at the same time
take into account the need to observe a high standard of estate management practice.
When selling or letting its property the Crown Estate should always seek to achieve the best consideration (i.e. price) which can reasonably be obtained in all the circumstances, but discounting any monopoly value (mainly from ownership of the foreshore and seabed).
The Crown Estate cannot grant leases for a term of longer than 150 years.
The Crown Estate cannot grant land options for more than ten years unless the property is re-valued when the option is exercised.
The Crown Estate cannot borrow money.
Donations can be made for religious or educational purposes connected with the estate or for tenants' welfare. Otherwise, charitable donations are forbidden.
The character of the Windsor Estate (park and forest) must be preserved; no part of the estate may be sold.
A report should be submitted to the monarch and to Parliament annually, showing the performance of the estate over the previous year.
The Crown Estate should observe professional accounting practices and distinguish in its accounts between capital and revenue.
Money received as a premium from a tenant on the granting of a new lease should be allocated between capital and revenue as follows:
where the lease is for a term of thirty years or less it must be treated as revenue;
for leases of more than thirty years it must be treated as capital.

In 2010 a UK Parliament Treasury Committee report on the Crown Estate, the first for twenty years, reported that
 it is "alarmed" that the Crown Estate in 2007 started investing in joint ventures such as the Gibraltar Limited Partnership, which it says is in "grave" financial difficulties. The Crown Estate owns 50% of the partnership, which owns the Fort Kinnaird retail park near Edinburgh;
 the Crown Estate has a monopoly over the marine environment, and has focused too strongly on collecting revenues rather than acting in the long-term public interest around ports and harbours;
 the quality of residential property management in the urban estate falls short. Consultation processes have lacked transparency, and the committee was "particularly concerned" that the Crown Estate had failed to consult local bodies which had rights to nominate key workers;
 some non-commercial historic properties should be reviewed with a view to transferring management to conservation bodies such as English Heritage;
 ministers should take a greater interest in the Crown Estate, because its overall management struggles to balance revenue generation with acting in the wider public interest.

Crown Estate chief executive Roger Bright said: "We welcome the Committee’s recognition that we run a successful business operation."

Holdings

Urban portfolio 

This includes the entirety of Regent Street and around half of St James's in London's West End as well as retail property across the UK in locations including Oxford, Exeter, Nottingham, Newcastle, Harlow, and Swansea.

In 2002 the Crown Estate began implementing a £1 billion investment programme to improve Regent Street's commercial, retail, and visitor facilities and public realm. In addition, it is investing £500 million in St James's, including a number of major redevelopments.

Rural portfolio 

Holdings consist of around 116,000 hectares (287,000 acres) of agricultural land and forests, together with minerals and residential and commercial property.

Windsor Estate 

The Windsor Estate covers approximately 6,300 hectares and includes Windsor Great Park, the Home Park of Windsor Castle, extensive forests, residential and commercial properties, golf courses, a racecourse and let farms.

Marine holdings 

The Crown Estate's marine holdings consist of:

The Crown Estate plays a major role in the development of the offshore wind energy industry in the UK. Other commercial activity managed by the Crown Estate on the seabed includes wave and tidal energy, carbon capture and storage, aggregates, submarine cables and pipelines and the mining of potash. In terms of the foreshore, the Crown Estate issue licences or leases for around 850 aquaculture sites and owns marina space for approximately 18,000 moorings. , marine holdings had a value of £4.1 billion.

Other rights and interests 
Other rights and interests include:

Finances 
In the 2021/2022 fiscal year, the Crown Estate's property evaluation was £15.6 billion with a £312.7 million net revenue profit, which is paid into the Consolidated Fund of the UK government.

Governance

Historical 
Previous officials responsible for managing what is now the Crown Estate were:
Surveyor General of Woods, Forests, Parks, and Chases and Surveyor General of the Land Revenues of the Crown, 17th century to 1810
Commissioners of Woods, Forests and Land Revenues, 1810–1831
Commissioners of Woods, Forests, Land Revenues, Works and Buildings, 1832–1850
Commissioners of Woods, Forests and Land Revenues, 1851–1924
Commissioners of Crown Lands, 1924–1954

Chairmen and chief executives of the Crown Estate Commissioners 
Chairmen (First Commissioner)
1955–62 – Sir Malcolm Trustram Eve (later Lord Silsoe) (1894–1976)
1962–77 – The Earl of Perth (1907–2002)
1977–80 – Lord Thomson of Monifieth (1921–2008)
1980–85 – The Earl of Crawford and Balcarres (1927–2023)
1985–95 – The Earl of Mansfield and Mansfield (1930–2015)
1995–2002 – Sir Denys Hartley Henderson (1932–2016)
2002–2009 – Sir Ian David Grant (1943–2022)
2010–2016 – Sir Stuart Hampson (born 1947)
2016 – Robin Budenberg (born 1959)

Chief executives (Second Commissioner)
1955–60 – Sir Ronald Montague Joseph Harris (1913–1995)
1960–68 – Sir Jack Alexander Sutherland-Harris (1908–1986)
1968–78 – Sir William Alan Wood (1916–2010)
1978–83 – Sir John Michael Moore (1921–2016)
1983–89 – Dr Keith Dexter (1928–1989)
1989-2001 – Sir Christopher Howes (born 1942)
2001–2011 – Roger Martin Francis Bright (born 1951)
2012–2019 – Dame Alison Nimmo (born 1964)
2019 – Dan Labbad

The chairman (formally titled "first commissioner") is part-time. The chief executive (the "second commissioner") is the only full-time executive member of the Crown Estate's board.

See also 
Balmoral Castle
Crown Estate Paving Commission
Duchy of Cornwall
Duchy of Lancaster
Prince's Coverts – Area of managed woodland in Oxshott, Surrey
Regent Street
Sandringham House
Windsor Great Park
 Patrimonio Nacional

Notes

References 
Annual Reports of Commissioners of Woods and Forests 1811, 1853 and 1855
Best, G. Percival (writing as "G. Percival"), "The Civil List and the Hereditary Revenues of the Crown", The Fortnightly Review, London, March 1901
Commissioners of Enquiry into the Woods, Forests and Land Revenues of the Crown, Twelfth Report, London, 1792
Crown Estate, The, Annual report and accounts 2009. Retrieved July 2009
Pugh, R B., The Crown Estate – an Historical Essay, London, The Crown Estate, 1960

External links 

Crown Estate annual report of assets

 
Statutory corporations of the United Kingdom government
HM Treasury
Estate
 
Real estate in the United Kingdom
Agriculture in the United Kingdom
United Kingdom coast and countryside
Forests and woodlands of the United Kingdom
1961 establishments in the United Kingdom
Organisations based in the City of Westminster
Monarchy and money